The 2nd constituency of the Seine-Maritime (French: Deuxième circonscription de la Seine-Maritime) is a French legislative constituency in the Seine-Maritime département. Like the other 576 French constituencies, it elects one MP using the two-round system, with a run-off if no candidate receives over 50% of the vote in the first round.

Description
The 2nd Constituency of the Seine-Maritime covers the south east portion of the department to the east of Rouen. With exception of 1988 the constituency had supported the centre right UDF and UMP parties until 2017 when it succumbed to the En Marche! landslide.

The winning candidate Annie Vidal of En Marche! secured the seat with over 60% of the second round vote having secured twice the vote of the incumbent Françoise Guégot of the Republicans in the first round.

Assembly Members

Election results

2022

 
 
 
 
 
 
 
|-
| colspan="8" bgcolor="#E9E9E9"|
|-

2017

 
 
 
 
 
 
|-
| colspan="8" bgcolor="#E9E9E9"|
|-

2012

 
 
 
 
 
|-
| colspan="8" bgcolor="#E9E9E9"|
|-

2007

 
 
 
 
 
 
 
|-
| colspan="8" bgcolor="#E9E9E9"|
|-

2002

 
 
 
 
 
|-
| colspan="8" bgcolor="#E9E9E9"|
|-

1997

 
 
 
 
 
 
 
 
|-
| colspan="8" bgcolor="#E9E9E9"|
|-

References

2